The 2007 Vietnam food scare was a food scandal which exposed contaminated food.  Among the issues were formaldehyde in noodles of the national dish, phở, banned pesticides in vegetables and fruit, and toxic soy sauce.

References

2007 scandals
2007 health disasters
Food Scare
Food safety scandals
Vietnam,2007
Food Scare,2007
Pho